Places is a compilation album by American banjoist Béla Fleck, recorded in 1988. It marks Fleck's last record with Rounder Records, subsequent label change to Warner Bros. Records and soon birth of the Flecktones, who would release their debut album in 1990.

Track listing 
All tracks written by Béla Fleck except where noted

 "Deviation" 04:22
 "Reverie" 01:30
 "Nuns for Nixon" 04:05
 "Malone" (Kenny Malone) 01:08
 "Moontides" 05:33
 "Another Morning" 03:26
 "Lowdown" 03:31
 "The Bullfrog Shuffle" 01:32
 "Places" 07:07
 "Snakes Alive" 04:20
 "Ladies and Gentleman" 02:20
 "Light Speed" 02:28
 "Ireland" 06:48
 "Four Wheel Drive" 03:53
 "Perplexed" 06:21
 "The Old Country" 02:58
 "Hudson's Bay" 05:22
 "Close to Home" 04:02

Personnel
 Béla Fleck - banjo
 Darol Anger - cello
 Sam Bush - mandolin
 John Cowan - bass
 Jerry Douglas - dobro
 Pat Enright - guitar
 Mark Hembree - bass
 Connie Herd - violin
 Kenny Malone - drums
 Mike Marshall - mandolin
 Edgar Meyer - bass
 Mark O'Connor - fiddle
 Tony Rice - guitar
 Mark Schatz - bass

References

1988 compilation albums
Béla Fleck albums
Rounder Records compilation albums